Tracy Municipal Airport  is a city-owned public-use airport located one mile northeast of the central business district of Tracy, a city in Lyon County, Minnesota, United States.

Facilities and aircraft 
For the 12-month period ending September 13, 2010, the airport had 3,040 aircraft operations, an average of 58 per week: 100% general aviation. At that time there were 6 aircraft based at this airport: 6 single-engine.

References

External links 
 

Airports in Minnesota
Buildings and structures in Lyon County, Minnesota
Transportation in Lyon County, Minnesota